The Dark Horse is a 1932 American pre-Code political comedy film, starring Warren William and Bette Davis. The movie was directed by Alfred E. Green.

Plot
The Progressive Party convention is deadlocked for governor, and so both sides nominate the dark horse Zachary Hicks (Guy Kibbee). Kay Russell (Bette Davis) suggests they hire Hal Blake as campaign manager; but first they have to get him out of jail for not paying alimony. Blake (Warren William) organizes the office and coaches Hicks to answer every question by pausing and then saying, "Well yes, but then again no." Blake will sell Hicks as dumb but honest. Russell refuses to marry Blake, while Joe (Frank McHugh) keeps people away from Blake's office. Blake teaches Hicks a speech by Lincoln. At the debate when the conservative candidate Underwood recites the same speech, Blake exposes him as a plagiarist. Hicks is presented for photo opportunities and gives his yes-and-no answer to any question, including whether he expects to win.

When Blake's ex-wife Maybelle (Vivienne Osborne) arrives at the office demanding to see him about another missed alimony payment, Joe wards her off by claiming Blake's aunt died and that he is away settling a big inheritance; but as she is leaving, Hicks makes eyes at her and takes her in to see Blake. She demands money or will send Blake back to jail. Blake asks Kay for $400 and pays Maybelle. Discovering its purpose, Kay angrily grabs the money back but returns it to Maybelle after receiving in the morning mail a necklace from Blake with a sentimental message. With Hicks heavily favored,  Blake is expecting a $50,000 bonus for winning the election and gets Kay to agree to marry.

Underwood's manager Black secretly meets with Maybelle, who has been seeing Hicks, and plans a set-up to disgrace Hicks on the eve of the election. Maybelle lures Hicks out of town after he slips away from Joe, who is supposed to be watching over him. They go to a cabin where Maybelle initiates a game of strip poker with the candidate. Black brings the sheriff; but Blake and Joe get there first to remove Hicks, who has been reduced to a union suit.  As Joe and Hicks escape out the back, the sheriff tries to arrest Blake for crossing a state line for immoral purposes. Blake claims they are married but has to wed Maybelle again to satisfy the sheriff. Kay walks out on Blake; but after Hicks wins the election, Blake gets Kay arrested for abandoning a child- him. They decide to head for Nevada to manage another campaign, while arranging another divorce and marriage.

Cast
Warren William as Hal Samson Blake
Bette Davis as Kay Russell
Guy Kibbee as Zachary Hicks
Vivienne Osborne as Maybelle Blake, Hal's Ex-Wife
Frank McHugh as Joe
Sam Hardy as Mr Black
Harry Holman as Mr Jones
Charles Sellon as Mr Green
Robert Emmett O'Connor as Sheriff
Berton Churchill as William A. Underwood
Robert Warwick as Mr Clark
Jim Thorpe as Blackfeet Chief (uncredited)

External links
 

1932 drama films
1932 films
American black-and-white films
American political comedy films
American political drama films
Films about elections
Films directed by Alfred E. Green
Films produced by Samuel Bischoff
First National Pictures films
1930s English-language films
1930s American films